Charles Gene "Chuck" Thomas (born December 24, 1960) is a former professional American football center in the  National Football League (NFL). He played seven seasons for the Atlanta Falcons (1985) and the San Francisco 49ers (1987–1992).

Chuck Thomas owns a rare hat trick in the world of American football.  He played on teams which won championships at three levels of competition.  In 1978, he was a member of the Stratford High School Spartans which won the Class 4A Texas State High School Championship.  In 1985, he was a member of the Oklahoma Sooners who won the NCAA Division I National Football Championship.  In 1988 & 1989 he was a member of the San Francisco 49ers which won Super Bowl XXIII & Super Bowl XXIV respectively.

1960 births
Living people
Players of American football from Houston
American football centers
Oklahoma Sooners football players
Atlanta Falcons players
San Francisco 49ers players
National Football League replacement players